Arthur Grey or Gray may refer to:

Arthur Gray (rugby) (1917–1991), rugby union and rugby league footballer of the 1940s for England (RU), Otley, and Wakefield Trinity (RL)
Arthur Gray (Hawkhurst Gang) (1713–1748), one of the leaders of the notorious Hawkhurst Gang, who was executed in 1748
Arthur Grey, 14th Baron Grey de Wilton (1536–1593), English nobleman, Lord Deputy of Ireland
Arthur Grey Hazlerigg, 1st Baron Hazlerigg (1878–1949), also known as Sir Arthur Grey Hazlerigg, 13th Baronet, a British peer
Arthur Grey Hazlerigg, 2nd Baron Hazlerigg
Paddy Gray (cricketer) (1892–1977), born Arthur Gray, Australian cricketer
Arthur Gray (athlete), English athlete
Arthur Gray (golfer) (1879–1916), English golfer
Arthur Gray (Master of Jesus) (1852–1940), English academic
Arthur Gray (philatelist) (1939–2015), Australian philatelist
 E. Arthur Gray (1925–2007), American politician from New York